The Devil's Cut is the third studio album by heavy metal band White Wizzard, released on June 3, 2013.

A music video for the song "Strike the Iron" was released on October 22, 2013. It was directed by Don Adams.

Track listing

Personnel
  Joseph Michael - Vocals
  Jon Leon - Guitar/Bass
 Jake Dreyer - Guitar
 Will Wallner - Guitar
  Giovanni Durst - Drums

References

2013 albums
White Wizzard albums